This is a list of Albanian folklorists.

Folklorists
 Mehdi Bardhi (1927–1994)
 Anton Berisha (born 1946)
 Tahir Dizdari (1900–1972)
 Visar Dodani (1857–1939)
 Nikollë Filja (1691–1769)
 Shtjefën Gjeçovi (1874–1929)
 Karl Gurakuqi (1895–1971)
 Petro Janura (1911–1983)
 Zef Jubani (1818–1880)
 Sotir Kolea (1872–1945)
 Donat Kurti (1903–1983)
 Thimi Mitko (1820–1890)
 Bernardin Palaj (1894–1947)
 Gjergj Pekmezi (1872–1938)
 Girolamo de Rada (1814–1903)
 Giuseppe Schirò (1865–1927)
 Shefqet Pllana (1918–1994)
 Dhimitër Shuteriqi (1915–2003)
 Ramadan Sokoli (1920–2008)

References

Albanian folklorists
Folklorists